Allen Jamel Lazard (born December 11, 1995) is an American football wide receiver for the New York Jets of the National Football League (NFL). He played college football at Iowa State University and was originally signed by the Jacksonville Jaguars as an undrafted free agent in 2018.

Lazard was a highly-rated recruit coming out of high school, where he was named a USA Today High School All-American. Lazard has been selected to the First-team All-Big 12 in both 2016 and 2017 and is Iowa State's career leader in both receptions and receiving yards.

High school career
At Urbandale High School, Lazard played high school football and was a four-year starter on both offense and defense.  Lazard still holds the school career records in receptions (105), receiving yards (2,349), touchdowns (34) and interceptions (14). His high school honors include but are not limited to: USA Today All American, Des Moines Register's Offensive Player of the Year in 2013, Defensive Player of the Year in 2012, and a three-time All-State selection.

A consensus four-star wide receiver, Lazard was a highly touted recruit out of high school.  He was ranked the No. 1 recruit of the state of Iowa and the 7th best receiver in the country by Rivals. Lazard ultimately followed his father Kevin (1990–93) and brother Anthony (2013–16) in playing for the Iowa State Cyclones over Notre Dame, Nebraska, Stanford, California and Iowa.

Prior to enrolling at Iowa State, Lazard played in the 2014 U.S. Army All-American Bowl.

College career

2014 season
Opting not to redshirt, Lazard started 11 of the Cyclones 12 games. He finished second on the team in receptions (45) and receiving yards (593) as well as scoring three touchdowns. Both reception and receiving totals rank second all-time for an ISU freshman. The first catch of his career went for 48 yards against North Dakota State and he caught his first career touchdown pass against Kansas State the next week. His season high was 96 yards and a touchdown against the Toledo Rockets.

At the conclusion of the season, Lazard was named to the All-Big 12 honorable mention team and earned ESPN.com Big 12 All-Underclassman honors.

2015 season
Lazard built on the success from his freshman season by starting all 11 games he played in and led the team in receptions (56), receiving yards (808) and touchdown catches (6). He ranked fifth in the Big 12 and 59th nationally in receptions per game (5.1) and was sixth in the Big 12 and 51st in the nation in receiving yardage (73.5). His seasons highs included a then career-high 147 yards receiving and a career-long 74-yard touchdown against TCU and a pair of touchdowns on five catches for 87 yards against Kansas State.

Lazard was named Second-team All-Big 12 by the AP and ESPN's Big 12 All-Underclassman team for second-straight season as well receiving the Pete Taylor Most Valuable Player.

2016 season
Lazard's breakout season was in 2016 and was one of the greatest single seasons in Cyclone history.  He once again led the team in receptions (69), receiving yards (1,018) and TD catches (7) as well as breaking the school record for 100-yard receiving games with six and becoming the fourth player in school history to record a 1,000-yard season. He ranked sixth in the Big 12 and 37th nationally in receptions per game (5.8) and ranked fifth in the Big 12 and 29th nationally in receiving yards per game (84.8). Lazard opened the season with back-to-back 100-yard games against in-state rivals UNI (129) and Iowa (111). Against Kansas State, he tallied eight receptions for 134 yards. He recorded a career-high 10 receptions for 120 yards and a touchdown against Kansas. Lazard finished the season with three straight 100-yard games against Kansas (120), Texas Tech (137) and West Virginia (103).

Lazard was named First-team All-Big 12 by the Coaches and ESPN and as the Pete Taylor Most Valuable Player for the second straight year.

2017 season

In 2017, Lazard continued on his success of 2016. He again led the team in receptions, receiving yards, and touchdowns with 71, 941, and 10 respectively. Against Northern Iowa, Lazard had eight receptions for 108 yards, he followed that up with two touchdown catches against Iowa the next week. In the win at No. 3 Oklahoma, Allen had 69 yards and a game-sealing touchdown. In the home victory against TCU, Lazard had another 100-yard performance with 106 yards on six catches. His two best games of the season were nine receptions for 126 yards and a touchdown against Oklahoma State and 10 catches for 142 yards and a touchdown in the Liberty Bowl win against No. 19 Memphis.

At the conclusion of the season, Lazard was named First-Team All-Big 12 by the coaches and Second-team All-Big 12 by the media.

College statistics

College records
Iowa State

 Career receptions, 241
 Career receiving yards, 3,360
 Single season touchdowns, 10 (2017)
 Consecutive games with a reception, 48
 Consecutive 100-yard receiving games, 4
 100-yard receiving games, 12

Professional career
Lazard received an invitation to take part in the 2018 Senior Bowl.

Jacksonville Jaguars
Lazard signed with the Jacksonville Jaguars as an undrafted free agent on April 30, 2018. He was waived on September 1, 2018, and was signed to the practice squad the next day.

Green Bay Packers

2018 season
On December 18, 2018, Lazard was signed by the Green Bay Packers off the Jaguars' practice squad.

2019 season
Lazard was waived on August 31, 2019 and was signed to the practice squad the next day. He was promoted to the active roster on September 4, 2019. Lazard recorded his first professional touchdown, a 35-yard reception from Aaron Rodgers, during a Week 6 win over the Detroit Lions on October 14, 2019. He had a breakout performance on December 1, 2019, in a 31–13-week-13 victory over the New York Giants, posting three catches for 103 yards and a touchdown. Overall, Lazard finished the 2019 season with 35 receptions for 477 receiving yards and three receiving touchdowns, while also adding one rushing attempt for 21 yards.

2020 season
On March 17, 2020, the Packers tendered Lazard as an exclusive-rights free agent. He signed the one-year tender on April 27, 2020. In the season-opener against the Minnesota Vikings, Lazard caught four passes for 63 yards and his first touchdown of the season during the 43–34 road victory. During Sunday Night Football against the New Orleans Saints in Week 3, Lazard finished with six receptions for 146 yards and a touchdown in the 37–30 road victory. He was placed on injured reserve on October 3, 2020, after undergoing core muscle surgery. Lazard was activated on November 17, 2020. In Week 12, in his second game off of injured reserve, Lazard caught his third touchdown of the season in a 41–25 victory over the Chicago Bears, along with 23 receiving yards. Lazard finished the season with 33 receptions for 451 yards and 3 touchdowns, nearly matching his previous year total despite playing in six fewer games.

In the Divisional Round of the playoffs against the Los Angeles Rams, Lazard recorded four catches for 96 yards, including a 58-yard touchdown, during the 32–18 win. In the NFC Championship against the Tampa Bay Buccaneers, Lazard recorded three catches for 62 yards during the 31–26 loss.

2021 season

On July 28, 2021, Lazard signed his exclusive rights tender, keeping him in Green Bay for the 2021 season. Lazard's season started off slowly, having 15 catches for 184 yards through the first eight games of the season. On October 26, ahead of the Packers' Week 9 game against the Arizona Cardinals, fellow wide receiver Davante Adams tested positive for COVID-19. Lazard, who was unvaccinated, was placed on the COVID-19/Reserve list due to being a close contact. He was activated off the COVID-19/Reserve list on November 1, 2021. Lazard was fined $14,650 for violating NFL COVID-19 protocols along with quarterback Aaron Rodgers.

Lazard was the recipient of backup quarterback Jordan Love's first NFL touchdown in a Week 9 13–7 road loss to the Kansas City Chiefs Lazard picked up the pace through the second half of the season. In Week 14, Lazard had six receptions for 75 yards and a touchdown in a 45–30 win over the Chicago Bears. In Week 16, in a Christmas Day showdown with the Cleveland Browns, Lazard caught Rodgers' 443rd career touchdown pass with the Packers, breaking the previous record of 442, held by Brett Favre. The following week, he caught all six of his targets for 72 yards and a touchdown as the Packers won 37–10 against the Minnesota Vikings to clinch home-field advantage throughout the playoffs. In the regular-season finale, Lazard played just one half as the Packers rested their starters in the second half against the Detroit Lions; despite that, Lazard matched a season-high 75 receiving yards and notched a career-high two touchdowns in a single game as the Packers lost on the road by a score of 37–30.

Lazard finished the 2021 season with 40 receptions for 513 yards and eight touchdowns, all career highs. His five touchdowns over the final five weeks of the season were tied for second most in the NFL over that time span, second only to teammate Davante Adams.

On March 15, 2022, the Packers placed a second-round restricted free agent tender on Lazard. It was signed on June 13, 2022.

New York Jets
On March 17, 2023, Lazard signed a four-year, $44 million contract with the New York Jets.

NFL career statistics

Regular season

Postseason

References

External links
Iowa State Cyclones bio

1995 births
Living people
Players of American football from Des Moines, Iowa
American football wide receivers
Iowa State Cyclones football players
Jacksonville Jaguars players
Green Bay Packers players
New York Jets players